Commander The Honourable John Montagu Granville Waldegrave, DSC RN (29 August 1905 – 18 February 1944) was a British naval commander during World War II.

Early life
Waldegrave was the only son of the Montague Waldegrave, 5th Baron Radstock and his wife, Constance Marion Brodie.

Naval service

Waldegrave commanded the cruiser  1938–1939, and the sloop  in 1939. He was awarded the DSC for anti-submarine work performed while commanding the Puffin.

From 1942 to 1943, he served in the Operations Division, attached to shore station . On 6 September 1943, he was assigned to the cruiser  as executive officer. On 18 February 1944, Penelope was torpedoed by  while returning from Anzio and Cmdr. Waldegrave was lost with the ship.

Marriage and children
On 29 June 1940, Waldegrave married Lady Hersey Boyle (11 July 1914 – 7 February 1993), second daughter of retired navy man Patrick Boyle, 8th Earl of Glasgow.  They had two daughters:

 Hon Horatia Marion Waldegrave (born 1 August 1941), married Oliver John Diggle (b. 19 February 1934) and had three children Rowena Mary Diggle, John Wyndham Hugh Diggle and Emma Georgiana Diggle
 Hon Griselda Hyacinthe Waldegrave (born 6 June 1943), married and had issue

References

External links
Royal Navy (RN) Officers 1939-1945

1905 births
1944 deaths
British people of English descent
Royal Navy officers
Royal Navy officers of World War II
Royal Navy personnel killed in World War II
Recipients of the Distinguished Service Cross (United Kingdom)
John
Heirs apparent who never acceded